Lovell's Athletic F.C. was the works team for Lovell's sweet factory in Newport, Monmouthshire, Wales, which played professional football from 1918 until 1969.

History
Lovell's joined the Western Football League in 1923 and won the title in their inaugural season. In 1928, they moved to the Southern League, but left in 1930, with the first team taking the reserves' place in the Welsh Football League. They entered a second side in The Football Combination for the 1930–31 season only, finishing bottom of the inaugural Second Division with 15 points from their 26 games. Teams in that league included Bournemouth, Bristol City, Norwich City, Peterborough United and Swindon Town.

Lovell's rejoined the Western League in 1931. They won their second title in 1938–39, and the following year joined the Southern League's wartime competition. During World War II, Newport County did not field a team, so Lovell's were the premier team in Newport for that period.
In the 1945–46 FA Cup, they reached the Third Round, losing 12–3 on aggregate in a two-legged match against Wolverhampton Wanderers, having defeated AFC Bournemouth of the Football League Third Division South in the First Round 6–4 on aggregate.

Lovell's returned to the Southern League in 1947. Following the 1947–48 season the club applied for election to the Football League, along with nine other non-league teams. However the two Third Division South teams seeking re-election, Norwich City and Brighton and Hove Albion, were both re-elected.

Lovell's left the Southern League in 1959 after finishing in the relegation zone of the North West Division. They continued to play in the Welsh League until disbandment in 1969.

In their 51-year existence they were Welsh League champions six times, Southern League champions and Welsh Cup winners. The old Rexville ground is now a housing estate named "The Turnstiles".

Honours
Western League
Champions: 1924, 1939
Runners-up: 1936
Southern League Midland Division
Joint Champions: 1940
Welsh Football League
Winners: 1931–32, 1937–38, 1938–39, 1945–46, 1946–47, 1947–48, 1965–66
Welsh Cup
Winners: 1948
Runners-up: 1959
Welsh Amateur Cup
Winners: 1925–26, 1926–27, 1927–28, 1953–54
Runners-up: 1922–23, 1923–24, 1938–39
South Wales FA Senior Cup
Winners: 1930–31, 1936–37, 1948–49, 1954–55
Monmouthshire/Gwent Senior Cup
Winners (10): 1929–30, 1930–31, 1936–37, 1937–38, 1938–39, 1946–47, 1948–49, 1949–50, 1951–52, 1954–55
Monmouthshire/Gwent Amateur Cup
Winners (2): 1925–26, 1928–29

History
FA Cup progress: Third round defeat by Wolverhampton Wanderers, 1946.
Record FA Cup victory: 7–1 vs. Stonehouse, 1954.
Record Welsh Cup victory: 3–0 vs. Shrewsbury Town, 1948 final.

References

External links
Wartime competition tables: 1942/1943, 1944/1945, 1944/1945

Defunct football clubs in Wales
Football clubs in Newport, Wales
Association football clubs established in 1918
Association football clubs disestablished in 1969
Welsh football clubs in English leagues
Southern Football League clubs
1918 establishments in Wales
1969 disestablishments in Wales
Welsh Football League clubs
Works association football teams in Wales